The Blackboy Clock is a clock in Stroud. It is a Jack clock, with a small Black boy with a club that strikes the hours.

History

The clock was created in 1774 and is possibly one of only 20 examples of a jacquemart in the UK. Originally installed in a watchmakers shop on the High Street it was later moved to a school building. It was originally created to promote tobacco.

Controversy
A report commissioned by the Stroud District Council stated that "Whatever the inspiration or its origins, it has to be remembered that, without a doubt, the boy's image came directly or indirectly through the influence of slavery and colonialism". In April 2022 the Council recommended that the clock be removed.

References 

Stroud
Individual clocks in England